The Oxfordshire Women's cricket team is the women's representative cricket team for the English historic county of Oxfordshire. They play their home games at Akeman Street, Chesterton and are captained by Abi Currie.  In 2019, they played in Division Three of the final season of the Women's County Championship, and have since competed in the Women's Twenty20 Cup. They are partnered with the regional side Southern Vipers.

History
Oxfordshire Women played their first recorded match in 1948, against Buckinghamshire Women. They went on to play various one-off matches, often as a combined team with Berkshire, including games against touring Netherlands and Australia sides.

Oxfordshire joined the national county structure in 2007, competing in the County Challenge Cup, finishing bottom of their group in their first season. In the first season of the Women's Twenty20 Cup, in 2009, Oxfordshire won Division Eight with three wins from three games. They went on to become a regular Division Three side, and finished second in their group in every season between 2017 and 2019. In 2021, they competed in the South West Group of the Twenty20 Cup, and finished 5th with 2 victories. They finished second in their group of the 2022 Women's Twenty20 Cup. Oxfordshire bowler Chloe Westbury was the joint-second leading wicket-taker in the competition, with 13 wickets.

Oxfordshire gained promotion from Division Four of the Championship in 2012, and played in Division Three since then. Their most successful seasons came in the final years of the competition: finishing second in 2017 before topping Division 3C in both 2018 and 2019. In 2018, they lost a promotion play-off against Durham by 85 runs, whereas in 2019 there was no promotion as it was the final season of the County Championship.

In 2022, Oxfordshire joined the South Central Counties Cup, finishing second out of six teams in the inaugural edition.

Players

Current squad
Based on appearances in the 2022 season.  denotes players with international caps.

Notable players
Players who have played for Oxfordshire and played internationally are listed below, in order of first international appearance (given in brackets):

 Lauren Down (2018)
 Emilia Bartram (2022)

Seasons

Women's County Championship

Women's Twenty20 Cup

See also
 Oxfordshire County Cricket Club
 Southern Vipers

References

Cricket in Oxfordshire
Women's cricket teams in England